Imre Bajor (9 March 1957 – 6 August 2014) was a Hungarian actor and comedian.

References

External links

1957 births
2014 deaths
Hungarian male film actors
Hungarian comedians
Male actors from Budapest
Deaths from brain cancer in Hungary
Hungarian male television actors
21st-century Hungarian male actors